Dunagiri is a historic area in Almora district in the state of Uttarakhand in India. Dunagiri is known as the birthplace of modern-day Kriya Yoga due to the fact that Lahiri Mahasaya was initiated into Kriya Yoga by Mahavatar Babaji at this site.

Approximately  from Delhi, a cluster of six small villages forms the place that is variously known as Dunagiri, Drongiri and Doonagiri. 116 such villages combine to form the Development Block of Dwarahat, which falls under the District of Almora.

History 

According to the local tradition, the town has been regularly visited by sages (Rishi-Munis) of India who established their ashrams here in the midst of nature. Ashram of Garga Muni was at Dunagiri after whom river Gagas is said to have been named. Shukdev Muni's ashram (son of sage Ved Vyasa) was also here, at a place now known as "Shukdevi".  During their period of anonymous travel, the Pandavas of Mahabharata took shelter at Dunagiri. Pandukholi is said to be the place near Dunagiri where they stayed for a period of time. Pandav's Guru Dronacharya also did tapasya (devout austerity) at Dunagiri. Dunagiri is mentioned in Manas khand of Skanda Purana. Dunagiri Devi is described as Mahamaya Harpriya (Manas khand, 36.17–18). Manas khand of Skandpuran bestows Dunagiri with the title of Brahm-parvat (Divine Mountain). Among all the Shakti temples of Kumaon, Dunagiri is counted amid the most ancient ‘Sidh Shaktipeeth’, as a primary ‘ugra’ (intense) ‘peeths’ – called ‘Ugra Peeth’. This Shaktipeeth in its essence has been influenced over time by Shaiva, Vaishnav and Shakt practices.

Mahavatar Babaji Cave 
This cave is where Yoga Guru Lahiri Mahasaya got Kriya Yoga teachings directly from Mahavatar Babaji. Every day many pilgrims and Kriya Yogis that follow different gurus visit this cave.

Transportation

Rail 
Nearest Railway Station Kathgodham is 140 km.

Air 
Nearest airport Pantnagar Airport is 178 km, nearest International Airport is New Delhi International Airport.

Road 
47 km from Ranikhet and 100 km from Nainital.

See also 

 Kriya Yoga
 Mahavatar Babaji
 Lahiri Mahasaya
 Baba Hari Dass

References

External links

Almora
Temples in Uttarakhand

pl:Dunagiri
fi:Dunagiri